Heohiivka may refer to several places in Ukraine:

 Heorhiivka, Cherkasy Oblast
 Heorhiivka, Crimea
 Heorhiivka, Dnipropetrovsk Oblast
 Heorhiivka, Pokrovsk Raion, Donetsk Oblast
 Heorhiivka, Volnovakha Raion, Donetsk Oblast
 Heorhiivka, Kherson Oblast
 Heorhiivka, Luhansk Oblast
 Heorhiivka, Zaporizhzhia Oblast